Dino Škvorc (born 2 February 1990) is a Croatian football player who plays as a defender for and acts as assistant coach at Austrian third-tier side DSV Leoben.

Career
While still part of the NK Varteks youth system, Škvorc made his professional debut with the senior Varteks in the 2007–08 Prva HNL, in the away game against NK Osijek on 27 October 2007. He established himself as a starting eleven regular in the 2009–10 Prva HNL season, in which he appeared in 27 out of 30 league matches for the club.

In June 2010, after losing its main sponsorship deal (with Varteks clothing factory), Varteks changed its name to NK Varaždin, and immediately started suffering financial difficulties, leading to its players not consistently receiving their salaries. In June 2011, the Croatian Football Federation terminated Varaždin's contract with Škvorc, allowing him to sign a five-year contract with Dinamo Zagreb. In August 2011, he was loaned to NK Lokomotiva. In January 2012, Škvorc terminated his contract with Dinamo. In February 2012, Škvorc signed a sixth-month contract with Belgian club KV Mechelen with a possibility of a two-year extension.

Škvorc left Sheriff Tiraspol in January 2017. In February 2017, he signed for RNK Split. Later he played for 
Polet Sv. Martin na Muri.

Honours
Sheriff Tiraspol
Moldovan National Division: 2016–17
Moldovan Super Cup: 2016

References

External links
 

1990 births
Living people
Sportspeople from Čakovec
Association football defenders
Croatian footballers
Croatia youth international footballers
Croatia under-21 international footballers
NK Varaždin players
GNK Dinamo Zagreb players
NK Lokomotiva Zagreb players
K.V. Mechelen players
Beitar Jerusalem F.C. players
Nea Salamis Famagusta FC players
FC Universitatea Cluj players
Hapoel Kfar Saba F.C. players
FC Sheriff Tiraspol players
RNK Split players
NK Ankaran players
FC Alashkert players
Budapest Honvéd FC players
NK Rudar Velenje players
DSV Leoben players
Croatian Football League players
Belgian Pro League players
Israeli Premier League players
Cypriot First Division players
Liga I players
Moldovan Super Liga players
Armenian Premier League players
Nemzeti Bajnokság I players
Second Football League (Croatia) players
Austrian Landesliga players
Austrian Regionalliga players
Croatian expatriate footballers
Expatriate footballers in Belgium
Expatriate footballers in Israel
Expatriate footballers in Cyprus
Expatriate footballers in Romania
Expatriate footballers in Moldova
Expatriate footballers in Slovenia
Expatriate footballers in Armenia
Expatriate footballers in Hungary
Croatian expatriate sportspeople in Belgium
Croatian expatriate sportspeople in Israel
Croatian expatriate sportspeople in Cyprus
Croatian expatriate sportspeople in Romania
Croatian expatriate sportspeople in Moldova
Croatian expatriate sportspeople in Slovenia
Croatian expatriate sportspeople in Armenia
Croatian expatriate sportspeople in Hungary
Expatriate footballers in Austria
Croatian expatriate sportspeople in Austria